Longroy is a commune in the Seine-Maritime department in the Normandy region in northern France.

Geography
Longroy-Gamaches station has rail connections to Beauvais and Le Tréport.

Population

Places of interest
 The church dating from the nineteenth century.
 Ruins of a castle.

See also
Communes of the Seine-Maritime department

References

Communes of Seine-Maritime